Pixels is a 2010 French animated short film written and directed by Patrick Jean. It is about an invasion of New York City by classic 8-bit video game characters, such as those from Space Invaders, Pac-Man, and others.

The film won "the Annecy Cristal" (le Cristal d'Annecy) for Best Short Film at the 2011 Annecy International Animated Film Festival.

Plot
On a Brooklyn sidewalk, a man walks over to a trash can, leaves a 1980s-era television by it, and walks away. After a few seconds, the TV suddenly powers on and an 8-bit picture of a bomb appears. When its fuse runs out, the TV screen shatters, releasing a cloud of pixels (illustrated as voxels because of the three-dimensionality of the scene). The pixels fly over to Manhattan, where it releases various characters from 1980s arcade video games.

Space Invaders start to shoot downwards; on contact, the projectiles cause a delivery truck and two taxis to degenerate into pixels.

A cloud of pixels then flies down a subway station, eventually forming into Pac-Man, which eats subway trains and stations as it travels the tunnels. Its progress is shown on the subway status display, similar to the cleared-away dots on the original game screen.

Giant Tetris tiles then match up with floors of skyscrapers. One building gets a "Tetris", eliminating several mid-level floors, and the building's top falls onto the remainder of the building.

Arkanoids come and destroy the bricks of the Brooklyn Bridge's pier, resulting in the bridge collapsing.

Donkey Kong then throws a barrel from the Empire State Building and flattens a traffic light as well as breaking off a fire hydrant, from which sprays suddenly pixelated water.

Frogger is seen trying to cross traffic in the form of pixelated cars.

Finally, a giant pixelated bomb is shown. When it explodes, everything around it becomes pixelated. The effect envelopes the entire cityscape, and eventually the entire planet Earth, which changes to a single giant, cubic voxel, which continues rotating as it drifts away.

The end credits are shown as a high score list.

Feature film adaptation 

Columbia Pictures and Happy Madison Productions developed a movie called Pixels loosely based on this short film, in which the attacking video games behave more like an alien invasion rather than a natural disaster.  Tim Herlihy and Tim Dowling wrote the script, which Chris Columbus directed. Adam Sandler, Kevin James, Josh Gad, Peter Dinklage, Brian Cox, Ashley Benson and Michelle Monaghan star in the film.

The feature film shot principal photography in Toronto, Canada in June 2014 using downtown streets decorated to resemble Washington DC. It was released on July 24, 2015.

See also
"Anthology of Interest II", a 2002 episode from the TV series Futurama

References

External links 
 Pixels by Patrick Jean
 

2010 animated films
2010 films
Alien invasions in films
French animated short films
Films without speech
Apocalyptic films
Films about video games
Films set in New York City
2010 short films
Science fiction short films
Short films with live action and animation
Animated films without speech
Animated films based on video games
2010s French films